Ea Súp is a rural district (huyện) of Đắk Lắk province in the Central Highlands region of Vietnam. As of 2003 the district had a population of 40,164. The district covers an area of 1,750 km². The district capital lies at Ea Súp.

References

Districts of Đắk Lắk province